WCAO (600 AM "Heaven 600") is a commercial radio station in Baltimore, Maryland.  It broadcasts an urban gospel radio format and is owned by iHeartMedia, Inc.  It also airs some Christian talk and teaching programs.  The studios and offices are located at The Rotunda shopping center in Baltimore.

WCAO is powered at 5,000 watts.  To protect other stations on AM 600, it uses a four-tower array directional antenna at all times.  To improve its sound quality, WCAO broadcasts using HD Radio technology.  The transmitter is off Garrison Forest Road at Caves Woods Road in Owings Mills, Maryland.  Programming is also heard on the HD-2 digital subchannel of co-owned 102.7 WQSR.

History

Early years
Effective  December 1, 1921, the U.S. Department of Commerce, in charge of radio at the time, adopted a regulation formally establishing a broadcasting station category, which set aside the wavelength of 360 meters (833 kHz) for entertainment broadcasts, and 485 meters (619 kHz) for farm market and weather reports. On May 8, 1922, the Sanders & Stayman Company, at 319 North Charles Street, was issued a license for a new station on the shared 360 meter "entertainment" wavelength. The station's call letters, WCAO, were randomly assigned from a sequential roster of available call signs. WCAO was the second broadcasting station licensed in the state of Maryland, following WKC, also in Baltimore, which had been licensed the previous March. 

The station was reassigned to 1090 kHz in late 1924, and ownership was transferred to Albert A. and A. Stanley Brager at 842 North Howard Street the next year. In 1926, Monumental Radio at 848 North Howard Street gained ownership. In 1927, the station was assigned to 780 kHz, and the next year, under the provisions of the Federal Radio Commission's General Order 40, assigned to 600 kHz, which it has been on ever since.

Power was increased to 250 watts on 600 kc in 1929 and subsequent power changes brought the station up to 5 kw in 1942. In the 1930s, WCAO was powered at 1,000 watts by day and 500 watts at night, with studios at 811 West Lanvale Street.  It was a CBS Network affiliate during the 1930s and 1940s.  In that era, WCAO carried CBS dramas, comedies, news, sports, soap operas, game shows, children's shows and big band broadcasts during the "Golden Age of Radio."

From May 1937 until May 1957, radio announcer Charles Purcell and theatre organist Roland Nuttrell hosted a nightly live broadcast known as "Nocturne."  Nuttrell would play calming melodies on the organ at the Parkway Theatre or the Century Theatre, while many miles away in the WCAO studios located at the Upton Mansion, Purcell would read from his poetry book entitled The Book Of Golden Dreams. Nocturne received many positive reviews from listeners, noting it was far more effective at putting people to sleep than taking sleeping pills. The 20-year run of this program made it the longest-running radio program in Baltimore at that time.

In 1947, WCAO added an FM station, WCAO-FM (102.7 FM).  At first, it mostly simulcasted the AM station, but in the 1960s and 1970s, it aired its own classical music format.  Today, that station is co-owned WQSR.

Top 40 era
From the 1950s through the 1970s, WCAO was one of Baltimore's most popular stations, broadcasting a Top 40 format. WCAO disc jockeys were noted radio personalities for many young listeners such as Johnny Dark, Kerby Scott, Jack Edwards, Les Alexander, Bob Bartel, Frank Luber, Donn Keller, Paul Rodgers, Alan Field, and Gene Creasy.

Robert V. O. Swarthout of Monumental Radio Company operated the station until 1956, when it was purchased by Plough Broadcasting, a subsidiary of the Schering-Plough pharmaceutical company. By 1980, many contemporary music listeners had switched to FM radio to hear the latest hits.

Later formats
WCAO flipped to a country music format in 1982; however, it had trouble competing with FM counterpart WPOC (93.1 FM).  The country format lasted nine years.

On November 25, 1991, WCAO switched to an urban gospel format, becoming a competitor to similarly formatted WWIN-AM "Spirit 1400".

Past personalities
Eddie Hubbard was a popular WCAO disc jockey.  He later gained fame as a radio personality in Chicago.

References

External links

FCC History Cards for WCAO (covering 1927-1981)

Further reading
"Early Baltimore 'Wireless Telephone' (Radio) Stations", April 20, 2013.

CAO
Radio stations established in 1922
Gospel radio stations in the United States
1922 establishments in Maryland
IHeartMedia radio stations
Radio stations licensed before 1923 and still broadcasting